Bullet Scars is a 1942 American film produced and distributed by Warner Bros. It was directed by D. Ross Lederman with top-billed stars Regis Toomey, Adele Longmire and Howard da Silva.

Plot 
Gangster Frank Dillon (Howard da Silva) is on the run with his gang after a bank robbery in which one of them, Joe Madison (Michael Ames), is badly wounded. The gang stops at a doctor's office but, when the doctor tries to call the police about the gunshot wound, Dillon kills him.

Dillon holes up in a lodge and sends for Nurse Nora Madison (Adele Longmire), who comes because she is Joe's sister. Knowing she doesn't have the skill to treat her brother, she insists on a real doctor. Dillon finds Dr Steven Bishop (Regis Toomey), who is preparing to leave for a research assignment. Dillon promises to build Dr Bishop a complete research lab and pay him $500 a month if only he'll stay and heal Joe. Bishop accepts, not realizing who Dillon is.

Bishop and Nora operate on Joe, who remains paralyzed and unable to speak. The two gradually become closer, to Dillon's displeasure, as he feels as if Nora belongs to him. Bishop gradually begins to understand who Dillon is and, when Joe dies, Nora explains that Dillon will now kill them both. They conceal Joe's death, and Bishop asks Dillon to send two members of the gang to the pharmacist for medicine. Bishop writes out a prescription in what he tells Dillon is pharmaceutical Latin, but is actually information about the gang's location.

The pharmacist calls the sheriff, who calls in state troopers, resulting in a climactic shootout in which the gang is wiped out, and Bishop and Nora find their happy ending.

Cast 

Regis Toomey as Dr. Steven Bishop
Adele Longmire as Nora Madison
Howard da Silva as Frank Dillon
Ben Welden as Pills Davis
John Ridgely as Hank O'Connor
Frank Wilcox as Mike

Michael Ames as Joe Madison
Hobart Bosworth as Dr. Carter
Roland Drew as Jake
Walter Brooke as Leary
Creighton Hale as Jess
Hank Mann as Gilly
Sol Gorss as Dude
Don Turner as Mitch

References

External links 

1942 films
American crime drama films
1940s English-language films
American black-and-white films
Warner Bros. films
Films directed by D. Ross Lederman
1942 crime drama films
1940s American films